Abu Naṣr Abu Muḥammad ibn Saʿīd more commonly known as Al-Fatḥ al-Mawṣilī (died 835) was an Arab ascetic, weeper (bakkāʾ) and a hadith transmitter. He was born in Kar, Mosul, hence the nisba al-Mawsili. Al-Fath lived in the Abbasid capital of Baghdad, and he was a contemporary and a close friend of Bishr al-Ḥafi (died 227 AH/c. 841 AD). Both Al-Fath and Bishr has been claimed as forebears by later Ṣufis.

References 

9th-century Arabs
9th-century people from the Abbasid Caliphate
835 deaths
Year of birth unknown
Muslim saints